Läätsa is a village in Saaremaa Parish, Saare County, Estonia, on the island of Saaremaa. As of 2011 Census, the settlement's population was 95.

Läätsa harbour and Pagila beach are located in the village.

Before the administrative reform in 2017, the village was in Salme Parish.

References 

Villages in Saare County